216th Division or 216th Infantry Division may refer to:

 216th Division (People's Republic of China)
 216th Infantry Division (German Empire)
 216th Infantry Division (Wehrmacht)
 216th Coastal Division (Italy)
 216th Division (Imperial Japanese Army)
 216th Motor Rifle Division (Soviet Union)